Ethmia vidua is a moth in the family Depressariidae. It is found in Kazakhstan and Russia.

Subspecies
Ethmia vidua vidua (Kazakhstan)
Ethmia vidua flavilaterella Danilevsky, 1975 (Russia: Central Siberia)

References

Moths described in 1879
vidua